Daniela García Tena (born 31 August 2001) is a Spanish athlete. She competed in the women's 800 metres event at the 2021 European Athletics Indoor Championships.

References

External links
 

2001 births
Living people
Spanish female middle-distance runners
Place of birth missing (living people)
21st-century Spanish women